No Other Life is a novel by Northern Irish-Canadian writer Brian Moore, published in 1993.

The novel is set in the future, on the fictional Caribbean island of Ganae (based loosely on Haiti). The story is told by Father Paul Michel, a Canadian missionary to Ganae, as a letter to himself about the life he has led. Father Paul supports a young priest, Jeannot, in his rebellion against Ganae's despotic ruler Uncle D.

Reception
Reviewing the novel for The Independent, its critic Tom Adair said: "No Other Life dovetails questions of allegiance, tests of faith and the clash of cultures into a fiction of ideas tied at its heart to real lives lived. It is Moore's best work by far since Black Robe; at times it bites like a truly great novel. If pleasure indeed corrupts the soul, then this very novel is a 24 carat sin."

Henry Louis Gates Jr. in The New York Times described it as "a brilliant meditation on spiritual indeterminacy, on the struggle between religious and temporal faith – on the question of how (or even whether) religious belief should be expressed in the political realm".

Publishers Weekly described Moore's novel as "a work as compelling as his Booker-shortlisted Lies of Silence...This is the best writing Moore has done in many years, and certainly bears comparison with that other 20th-century classic about Haiti, Graham Greene's The Comedians."

Writing in The Independent in 2009, Stephen Smith, in a re-evaluation of the novel, explains that Moore, influenced by Graham Greene, "took a lead from the story of Jean-Bertrand Aristide and his real-life progress from rags to spiritual riches" and shows how the life of Moore's protagonist predicts the eventual political fate of Haiti's leader. "Moore's literary prescience, comparable to Greene's prefiguring the Cuban missile crisis in Our Man in Havana, has to the best of my knowledge never been remarked on".

References

Further reading
 Liam Gearon. "No Other Life: death and Catholicism in the novels of Brian Moore", April 1998, Journal of Beliefs and Values 19(1):33-46. DOI:10.1080/1361767980190103
 DeWitt Henry: "The Novels of Brian Moore: a retrospective" in Ploughshares issue 6, Fall 1974 
 Patrick Hicks: "Waiting for Jeannot: The (de)Construction of History in Brian Moore's No Other Life", Studies in Canadian Literature, Volume 24, Number 2 (1999)
 Allen Shepherd. “The Perfect Role of the Outsider: Brian Moore’s No Other Life.” New England Review (1990–), vol. 16, no. 3, Middlebury College Publications, 1994, pp. 164–167, http://www.jstor.org/stable/40242898.

1993 British novels
1993 Canadian novels
Knopf Canada books
Bloomsbury Publishing books
Doubleday (publisher) books
Novels by Brian Moore (novelist)
Novels set in the Caribbean